(Diederick) Martijn Oostra (born 12 November 1971, Waalre) is a Dutch graphic designer, photographer, artist and publicist. Oostra lives in Amsterdam, Netherlands.

References

External links
 Martijn Oostra (official website)
 Martijn Oostra on Issuu
 Martijn Oostra on Vimeo
 :nl:Martijn Oostra (Martijn Oostra, Dutch Wikipedia entry)

1971 births
Living people
Dutch graphic designers
Photographers from Amsterdam
People from Waalre